Rammetshofen is a village located 1 mile south of Oberteuringen in the Bodenseekreis of the federal state of Baden Wuerttemberg in Germany. It lies approximately 7.5 kilometers north of the Bodensee.

History 
In 1464, Joerg Count of Werdenberg and Heiligenberg, leased the Ramrachs Farm (an estate at Rammetshofen) to Ytelhans Huntpis, a citizen of Ravensburg. After Huntpis' death, the estate is again mentioned in a certificate dated 1538. In the early 19th century Rammetshofen had 58 inhabitants, which were explicitly labelled as "catholic" in a description by the relevant municipal authority in Tettnang.

Villages in Baden-Württemberg
Tübingen (region)
Bodenseekreis